No. 1 Yaari ( No.1 friendship) is an Indian web series and Television Talk show produced by Viu India (season — 1, 2) and Aha (season — 3) in Telugu (as No.1 Yaari with me Rana), Hindi (as No. 1 Yaari Jam), Marathi (as No. 1 Yaari with Swapnil) and Kannada. It is sponsored by McDowell's No.1. The show Is designed and directed by Sanjeev k.kumar.

In December 2017, Mame Khan collaborated with music composer duo Salim–Sulaiman to create the intro song.

Season overview

Seasons and episodes

References
https://m.timesofindia.com/tv/news/telugu/im-glad-he-has-found-his-yaari-for-lifetime-no-1-yaari-with-rana-season-3-director-sanjeev-on-rana-daggubati-miheekas-wedding/amp_articleshow/77435741.cms

External links

Indian web series
Hindi-language web series
Kannada-language web series
Telugu-language web series
Aha (streaming service) original programming
Indian television talk shows
Gemini TV original programming